The Panther's Claw is a 1942 American film directed by William Beaudine and distributed by Producers Releasing Corporation. It is a loose sequel to two Columbia Pictures films of the 1930s, The Night Club Lady and The Circus Queen Murder.

Plot
After a policeman catches Everett P. Digberry leaving a cemetery in the middle of the night, Digberry explains that he was instructed to leave $1,000 on his aunt's grave. He is brought to police headquarters where he explains that he received a letter with instructions from someone called the Panther, and several others who received similar letters are with the police as well. The police commissioner determines that the group members are all connected with an opera company. They suggest a baritone named Enrico Lombardi who may have a motive, as he was recently banished from the company.

Lombardi is enraged to find his name in the newspaper as the prime suspect and confronts Nina Politza, who had received a letter from the Panther. Digberry intervenes but Lombardi chokes and strikes him.

The police attempt to identify the Panther by comparing the typewritten letters to samples from various typewriters. The killer is revealed to be Captain Edgar Walters.

Cast 
Sidney Blackmer as Police Commissioner Thatcher Colt
Rick Vallin as Anthony 'Tony' Abbot
Byron Foulger as Everett P. Digberry
Billy Mitchell as Nicodemus J. Brown
Herbert Rawlinson as District Attorney Bill Dougherty
John Ince as Police Captain Mike Flynn
Martin Ashe as Officer Murphy
Walter James as Police Captain Tim Henry
Frank Darien as Samuel Wilkins
Joseph DeVillard as Antonio Spagucci
Jack Van as Giuseppe Bartarelli
Willy Castello as John Martin George
Harry Clark as Officer Lou Levinsky
Lew Leroy as Apartment Manager

External links 

1942 films
American mystery films
1940s English-language films
American black-and-white films
Films directed by William Beaudine
Producers Releasing Corporation films
1942 mystery films
1940s American films